George W. Bush's political positions have been expressed in public statements, and through his actions in the executive roles of governor of Texas and president of the United States.

Economic policy

Fiscal policy and taxation
George Bush supports enacting generous tax cuts in the model of Ronald Reagan's supply-side fiscal policies. He believes this helps the economy at large.

Energy policy
George Bush supported nuclear power and expanded domestic drilling. Bush pledged to work toward reduced reliance on foreign oil by reducing fossil fuel consumption and increasing alternative fuel production. He lifted a ban on offshore drilling in 2008, and said at the time, "This means that the only thing standing between the American people and these vast oil reserves is action from the U.S. Congress." Bush had said in June 2008, "In the long run, the solution is to reduce demand for oil by promoting alternative energy technologies. My administration has worked with Congress to invest in gas-saving technologies like advanced batteries and hydrogen fuel cells... In the short run, the American economy will continue to rely largely on oil. And that means we need to increase supply, especially here at home. So my administration has repeatedly called on Congress to expand domestic oil production."

In 2008, Bush announced that the United States would commit $2 billion towards an international fund to promote clean energy technologies, saying, "along with contributions from other countries, this fund will increase and accelerate the deployment of all forms of cleaner, more efficient technologies in developing nations like India and China, and help leverage substantial private-sector capital by making clean energy projects more financially attractive."

Entitlement reform
Bush supports the privatization of Social Security by allowing individuals to set up personal retirement accounts. He also supported the expansion of Medicare to cover prescription drugs using private insurance through his Medicare Part D program.

Free-market capitalism
Bush generally supports free-market capitalism, but claims to understand the importance of government involvements in private financial affairs if they are projected to have a negative impact on the economy as a whole. In November 2008, Bush claimed, "Our aim should not be more government. It should be smarter government."

During the beginning of his first term, Bush enacted corporate tax cuts in the hopes that the economy would flourish as a result. Later, in 2008, Bush supported major bailout plans for mortgage lenders and auto makers who were facing bankruptcy. Bush also enacted the first major economic stimulus in the face of an economy on the down-turn, which handed free checks to all private tax-paying citizens.

Trade
Bush is a supporter of free trade, calling on nations to embrace free trade.

Health care
Bush supports a free-market health care system, and opposes a universal health plan.

In 2004, Bush planned a health care program that he said would cover as many as 10 million people who lack health insurance at a cost of $102 billion over the next decade.

Foreign policy

Iraq War
On March 19, 2003, Bush ordered an invasion of Iraq, launching the Iraq War. That night, he addressed the nation, stating that he decided to invade Iraq "to disarm Iraq, to free its people and to defend the world from grave danger".
The United States and its allies charged that
Saddam Hussein's government possessed weapons of mass destruction (WMD), and thus posed a serious and imminent threat to the security of the United States and its coalition allies. This assessment was supported by the U.K. intelligence services, but not by other countries such as France, Russia and Germany. It was later and after the war revealed that there were never any weapons of mass destruction and this was confirmed by multiple international and national commissions.

Axis of evil
In his 2002 State of the Union Address, Bush declared the nations of North Korea, Iran, and Iraq, as well as "their terrorist allies", part of the axis of evil for their alleged support of terrorism.

Homeland security
After the attacks on the World Trade Center on September 11, 2001, President Bush founded the Cabinet Department of Homeland Security. He initially opposed it, arguing that the department placed an unnecessary bureaucratic burden on the U.S. government. Bush changed his mind in June 2002 to approve of the proposal, however its creation was delayed due to disagreements in Congress over labor protection and the role of trade unions in the department. The department was created on November 25, following the passage of the Homeland Security Act.

Civil liberties

Anti-terrorism and domestic surveillance
Bush is a supporter of anti-terrorist surveillance and information-gathering methods. In 2001 he signed into law the Patriot Act.

Habeas corpus
The November 13, 2001, Presidential Military Order gave the President of the United States the power to detain suspects, suspected of connection to terrorists or terrorism as an unlawful combatant. As such, it was asserted that a person could be held indefinitely without charges being filed against him or her, without a court hearing, and without entitlement to a legal consultant. Many legal and constitutional scholars contended that these provisions were in direct opposition to habeas corpus and the United States Bill of Rights.

Gun policy
Although generally an opponent of gun control, Bush has shown support for certain gun-restrictive policies. Following a shooting spree in Atlanta in July 1999, Bush announced his support for a ban on high-capacity magazines and an increase of the legal age for firearms from 18 to 21, calling these "reasonable measures." As governor of Texas, Bush initiated a program to provide Texas handgun owners with free trigger locks in May 2000, and pledged to push for the initiative on a nationwide scale if elected president. In 2003, Bush declared that he would seek a renewal of the Federal Assault Weapons Ban which was due to expire the following year, however it was later reported that he had "seemed disinclined" to push for it in Congress. Bush signed into law the Protection of Lawful Commerce in Arms Act in October 2005.

Social policy

Education: No Child Left Behind
President Bush proposed No Child Left Behind on January 23, 2001, just three days after his first inauguration. It was coauthored by Representatives John Boehner (R-OH) and George Miller (D-CA) and Senators Edward Kennedy (D-MA) and Judd Gregg (R-NH). The United States House of Representatives passed the bill on May 23, 2001 (voting 384–45), and the United States Senate passed it on June 14, 2001 (voting 91–8). President Bush signed it into law on January 8, 2002.

Abortion
Bush has a strong anti-abortion stance, consistently opposing abortion while supporting parental notification for minor girls who want abortions, the Mexico City Policy, a ban on intact dilation and extraction (commonly known as partial-birth abortion), adoption tax credits, and the Unborn Victims of Violence Act. Running for Congress in 1978, Bush had said that the decision to have an abortion should be a woman's personal decision, but he declared that he was anti-abortion in 1994.

Death penalty
Bush supports the death penalty. As Governor of Texas, he allowed 152 executions. He commuted the sentence of one prisoner on death row, Henry Lee Lucas, on June 15, 1998.

Environment

Bush opposed the Kyoto Protocol, saying that the treaty neglected and exempted 80 percent of the world's population and would have cost tens of billions of dollars per year. Bush announced the Clear Skies Act of 2003, aimed at amending the Clean Air Act to reduce air pollution through the use of emissions trading programs. The initiative was introduced to Congress, but failed to make it out of committee.

Bush has said that global warming is real and has noted that it is a serious problem, but he asserts there is a "debate over whether it's manmade or naturally caused". He announced plans to reaffirm the United States' commitment to work with major economies, and, through the United Nations, to complete an international agreement that will slow, stop, and eventually reverse the growth of greenhouse gases; he stated, "this agreement will be effective only if it includes commitments by every major economy and gives none a free ride."

LGBT issues
Bush opposed same-sex marriage. During his 2004 reelection campaign, he called for an amendment to the U.S. Constitution that would ban same-sex marriage in the United States but allow for the possibility of civil unions on the state level. He also stated in the famous Wead tapes that he would not "kick gays" and worried his refusal to do so might upset his evangelical supporters, and that "I think it is bad for Republicans to be kicking gays."

Prayer in public schools
Bush supported "voluntary, student-led prayer" but not "teacher-led prayers."

Stem cell research
Bush opposes federal funding for research relating to newly derived embryonic stem cell lines. He supports federal funding for research on pre-existing embryonic stem cell lines.

See also
 You're either with us, or against us

References

Political positions
Political positions of state governors of the United States
Political positions of presidents of the United States
Political positions of the 2004 United States presidential candidates